In software engineering, CI/CD or CICD is the combined practices of continuous integration (CI) and (more often) continuous delivery or (less often) continuous deployment (CD). They are sometimes referred to collectively as continuous development or continuous software development.

Comparison 
 Continuous integration: Frequent merging of several small changes into a main branch
 Continuous delivery: When teams produce software in short cycles with high speed and frequency so that reliable software can be released at any time, and with a simple and repeatable deployment process when deciding to deploy
 Continuous deployment: When new software functionality is rolled out completely automatically

Motivation 
CI/CD bridges the gaps between development and operation activities and teams by enforcing automation in building, testing and deployment of applications. CI/CD services compile the incremental code changes made by developers, then link and package them into software deliverables. Automated tests verify the software  functionality, and automated deployment services deliver them to end users. The aim is to increase early defect discovery, increase productivity, and provide faster release cycles. The process contrasts with traditional methods where a collection of software updates were integrated into one large batch before deploying the newer version. Modern-day DevOps practices involve:
 continuous development, 
 continuous testing, 
 continuous integration, 
 continuous deployment, and 
 continuous monitoring 
of software applications throughout its development life cycle. The CI/CD practice, or CI/CD pipeline, forms the backbone of modern day DevOps operations.

See also 
 Continuous integration (CI)
 Continuous delivery (CD)
 Continuous deployment (CD)

References

External links 
 
 

Software development